Moulvibazar-4 is a constituency represented in the Jatiya Sangsad (National Parliament) of Bangladesh since 1991 by Md. Abdus Shahid of the Awami League.

Boundaries 
The constituency encompasses Sreemangal and Kamalganj upazilas.

History 
The constituency was created in 1984 from the Sylhet-15 constituency when the former Sylhet District was split into four districts: Sunamganj, Sylhet, Moulvibazar, and Habiganj.

Ahead of the 2008 general election, the Election Commission redrew constituency boundaries to reflect population changes revealed by the 2001 Bangladesh census. The 2008 redistricting altered the boundaries of the constituency.

Ahead of the 2018 general election, the Election Commission expanded the boundaries of the constituency by adding four union parishads of Kamalganj Upazila: Adampur, Alinagar, Islampur, and Shamshernagar.

Members of Parliament

Elections

Elections in the 2010s 
Md. Abdus Shahid was elected unopposed in the 2014 general election after opposition parties withdrew their candidacies in a boycott of the election.

Elections in the 2000s

Elections in the 1990s

References

External links
 

Parliamentary constituencies in Bangladesh
Moulvibazar District
Kamalganj Upazila